A land lab is an area of land that has been set aside for use in biological studies.  Thus, it is literally an outdoor laboratory based on an area of land.

Studies may be elementary or advanced.  For instance, students may simply be given the task of identifying all the tree species in a land lab, or an advanced student may be doing an intensive survey of the microbial life forms found in a soil sample.

Hands on, tangible, project-base learning is a key aspect of land labs within an educational context.  Land labs can exist anywhere with outdoor access:  educational campuses, residential neighborhoods, peri-urban settings, urban settings, or even a small courtyard.  The driving principle behind land lab education is getting outside and interacting with the world directly.

Land labs are often marked out in plots or transects for studies.  A plot may be any size, usually marked out in square meters.  This allows for more intensive, delimited studies of changes and inventories of biota.  Transects are straight lines at which, at intervals, measurements are taken for a profile of the ecological community.

Land labs serve an important role in giving students access to a natural environment to observe native plants and wildlife, apply STEM concepts with hands on projects, and build a better understanding of how critical biodiversity is for ecological health.

Common educational projects conducted at a land lab often include: 

 Surveying pollinator species in pollinator gardens or in the native flora
 Restoring old agricultural land back to original landscapes such as: wetlands, prairie, or forest
 Composting biomass to rebuild healthy soil
 Maintaining beehives or other pollinator habitats for moths, ground bees, and other pollinators
 Recording weather conditions to better understand the microclimate
 Conducting nature studies to identify and observe local flora and fauna
 Planting native trees, grasses, and flowers to increase biodiversity
 Encouraging native riparian plant growth along ponds and streams
 Installing bird houses, bat houses and owl houses
 Holding art classes where students can paint flora, fauna and landscapes
 Collecting and removing trash and other man-made pollutants
 Designing low-impact trails and paths for visitors to explore the land lab

Real world K12 Land Lab Examples: 
A notable K12 land lab example is the Granville Land Lab in Ohio.

The Granville Land Lab is a good example of a student-driven land restoration project to further STEM education.

Below is a brief overview of the land lab project from their website:

"The Granville Land Lab is the largest outdoor K-12 educational facility in Ohio with 90 acres, soon to be 100 acres, of land. It functions as part of the Granville Schools Sustainability Project. The Land Lab was created to contribute to conservation by restoring the area in front of the Granville Intermediate School.  It is an outdoor classroom for students of the Granville Exempted School District, Denison University, and surrounding school districts of Licking County. It provides unique, hands-on experiences to help students learn about life, physical, and environmental sciences, math, English, art, and music."

 A quick introduction video about the Granville Land Lab
 Environmental Science teacher James Reding being interviewed about the land lab

Studying humans needs and sustainability in land labs: 

Learning to produce food, fiber and energy in sustainable ways is a tremendous opportunity for students of all ages within land labs.  Students can explore biomass energy, biogas fuels, solar energy, permaculture, composting, organic gardening, and many other facets of sustainability through land labs.

By designing systems that mimic natural processes (biomimicry), we are able to produce food, fiber, and energy in more sustainable ways for local communities.  Numerous environmental and economic benefits exist to growing food locally and producing energy locally.  These biomimicry inspired systems are circular in nature.  Nothing is wasted, as the outputs of one circular system become the inputs of another.

Circular systems in land labs:
Circular system experiments, promoting a circular economy, are a natural fit for educational land labs.  Circular systems function by ensuring that nothing is wasted.  Every output of a system becomes an input for another system.  

For example:  Food scraps feed chickens, chicken manure fertilizes the garden, the garden grows more vegetables, food scraps are then available from the vegetables to feed chickens.

Circular systems that are well-suited for land labs include:

 Biogas methane digesters for generating clean cooking fuel and liquid fertilizer for gardens
 Composting rollers for composting leaves, grass clippings, & food scraps
 Raising black soldier fly larvae on food waste to become feed for chickens or fish 
 Solar panels for providing on-site power
 Free range chickens for providing eggs and manure
 Greenhouses for growing mushrooms and seedlings
 Raised beds for market garden vegetables
 Beehives for garden pollination, honey, and wax
 Rotationally grazed pastures for goats, cattle, pigs, sheep, etc
 Biochar production to improve soil quality and sequester carbon
 Aquaponics systems for growing fish and greens symbiotically
 Rainwater collection systems for retaining water for gardens

Multi-disciplinary environment within land labs: 
Land labs help to form an ecosystem well suited for long-term project-based learning.  Students, teachers, and community members can participate in multi-disciplinary activities ranging from land restoration, animal husbandry, gardening, weather analysis to outdoor art studies.

The multi-disciplinary context within a land lab is perfect for cross-curricular education.  The following disciplines and subjects can all tie into land lab activities in an integrated fashion:

 Ecology - nature studies, increasing biodiversity, studying water cycle
 Biology - gardening, agriscience projects, botany
 Sustainable Agriculture - composting, permaculture, local food movement
 Engineering - building aquaponics, rainwater collection, animal shelters
 Chemistry - methane digesters, plant fertilization, solar power
 Life Sciences - carbon cycle, water cycle, composting biomass
 Animal Husbandry - free range chickens, goats, apiary
 Climate Studies - weather observation, weather logging
 History & Culture Studies - local food culture, history of agriculture, natural resources
 Culinary Arts - cooking garden produce using clean energy like biomass, biogas, or solar power
 Multi media arts - designing pollinator landscapes, bird houses, bat houses, murals 
 Painting - nature studies, murals
 Pottery - watering pots, plant pots
 Wood working - pollinator houses, chicken coop

Goals and outcomes of land lab education experiences: 

Land labs exist as perpetual educational projects that can span years to decades or more.  Common goals within a land lab are often:

 Restoring degraded land back into a balanced, biodiverse state
 Establishing an environment for native flora and fauna to thrive
 Building deep, rich soil with an active microbiome
 Growing local produce, herbs, and flowers
 Raising livestock with sustainable, ethical methods
 Producing healthy food for local communities
 Producing local energy to power the land lab operations
 Inspiring young people to care about biodiversity, agriculture, and nature
 Building real-life, practical STEM skills for students and adults
 Building strong communities around unique outdoor projects in nature
 Educating people about the benefits and simple joys found in gardening

Footprints and Sizes of Land Labs 
Land labs can be designed in all shapes and sizes.  The key attributes of a land lab are typically the following:

 Building an outdoor learning area designated for cross-curricular studies in a STEM environment
 Establishing a focus on increasing biodiversity and restoring local environmental features
 Educating people about meeting humans needs sustainably through agriculture, energy production, shelter, and sanitation

A small land lab could be as little as a courtyard, balcony garden, or a designated patch of land outside of a classroom window.  Conversely, larger land lab could encompass hundreds of acres.  The ideal size for a flexible land lab space allowing for many different ecological activities and circular systems is between 1/4 of an acre to 5 acres.

Sustainable societal solutions originating from land labs 
Land labs are real-life environments by design.  The project-based environment encourages students, teachers, and community members to experiment with ecological solutions that can be implemented on a small scale.

Ideally, the solutions and systems implemented in a land lab are transferred beyond the land lab and into the surrounding community.  Composting, rainwater catchment, food-waste upcycling with methane digesters and BSF, local food production, harnessing of solar power, and other land lab systems can all be implemented throughout a community at various scales:  residential, schools, community gardens, and local businesses.

The purpose of a land lab is to allow students to develop, implement, and learn about practical, sustainable solutions for addressing the five basic physiological needs all humans have:

 The need for clean water
 The need for healthy food
 The need for shelter
 The need for energy
 The need for sanitation 

Our industrial systems of providing food, water, energy, shelter, and sanitation have inherent weaknesses to their centralized models.  Long supply chains, fossil-fuel dependance, environmental damage, and the fragmented production of goods are common traits to industrial models.  Land labs tie these 5 basic human needs together in integrated systems.  

Permaculture is a concept of integrating these human needs into local, ecological, human-scale systems.  Land labs can be thought of as an education area for promoting creative solutions for meeting these needs, while ensuring the land and local ecology are being restored in the process.

Land labs provide students with real-world experiences to help change their behavior as consumers, and get them more involved with meeting their 5 physiological needs.

Land labs are focused on production rather than just consumption.  Western consumer culture makes the provision of our 5 basic physiological needs very abstract and far removed from the daily life of most people.

When these 5 basic needs are abstracted away from consumers, it is easier for the underlying systems providing these needs to operate without supervision to ensure they are ethical and sustainable.

Mental health benefits for students being outside 

In today's digital world, many students spend inordinate amounts of time on a screen both at home and at school.  Inherent limits exist to project based learning that takes place entirely behind a screen or within a classroom.

Land labs help break students out of a digital environment by providing much needed time outdoors.  Studies have shown that as our digital landscape of social media has exploded in popularity, depression and mental struggles have increased dramatically in students.

Studies also show that student's mental health benefits immensely from being outdoors and participating in hands on projects with meaningful outcomes.

Waste streams used in land labs 

Multiple types of local "waste" streams, that can often by obtained freely, can be used to supply a land lab with the raw materials to build soil, generate power, grow food, and restore biodiversity.

 Woodchips - Used for garden paths, mulch, composting & biochar. Often available from local tree companies or municipalities for free.
 Grass clippings - Used for compost and mulch.  Available from neighbors and onsite.
 Leaves - Used for compost and mulch.  Available from neighbors and onsite.
 Food waste - Used for composting, methane production, liquid fertilizer, and feeding BSF.
 Coffee grounds - Used for composting and BSF production.
 Pallets (Non-treated) - Used for making raised beds, biochar, composting bins, and other structures.
 IBC totes (Food grade) - Used for storing rainwater and liquid fertilizer. 
 5 Gallon Buckets - Used for collecting food waste, and other waste streams.
 Shredded paper - Used for composting.
 Shredded cardboard - Used for composting.
 Newspapers - Used for composting and mulching.
 Logs - Used for pollinator habitats.  Freely availably from many tree companies.
 Reclaimed lumber (non treated) - Used for raised beds, biochar, and small building projects.
 Billboard tarps - Used for rainwater catchment, roofing, and shade cloths.  Freely available from billboard companies.

Part of the process of building a land lab is developing relationships with local businesses, neighbors, restaurants, and community members to begin upcycling these wastes into the materials and systems needed within a land lab.  Many people have a desire to help students who are working hard on a meaningful community project.  Much of the materials listed above can be had for little to no cost as relationships are formed.

References

Scientific observation
Biology experiments